The Prix Goncourt des Lycéens is a French literary award created in 1987 as a sort of younger sibling of Prix Goncourt, a prestigious prize for French language literature. The ten members of the Académie Goncourt select twelve literary works as nominees. Some two thousand lycée (roughly equivalent to high school) students read all twelve novels, participate in discussions and debates about them, and ultimately vote on the winner.

While the prize bears the name of the Académie Goncourt, the competition is sponsored and organized by the French Ministry of National Education and the largest French media retailer Fnac, with the stated goal of encouraging young people to read.

Each year's winner is announced in Rennes on the same day as the announcement of the Prix Goncourt, usually in November.

Laureates of the Prix Goncourt des Lycéens

External links
 Official website (in French)
 French Department of Education website (in French)

Goncourt des Lyceens
1987 establishments in France
Awards established in 1987